Florence Susan Harrison (1877–1955) was an English Australian Art Nouveau and Pre-Raphaelite illustrator of poetry and children's books. Many of her books were published by Blackie and Son. She illustrated books by notable Pre-Raphaelite circle poets Christina Rossetti, William Morris and Sir Alfred Tennyson.

Harrison has often been confused with Emma Florence Harrison, an English artist who exhibited at the Royal Academy in 1887.

Biography
Harrison was born in London in 1877, the daughter of John Harrison, a printer, and Susan Harriet Harrison, a dressmaker. She showed an early talent for art and attended the South Kensington School of Art in London where she studied under the Pre-Raphaelite artist Sir Edward Burne-Jones (1833-1898).

Harrison's illustrations were heavily influenced by the Pre-Raphaelite style, characterized by its attention to detail, vibrant colors, and romanticized depictions of nature and mythology. She often depicted ethereal women wearing flowing dresses surrounded by flowers and foliage.

In 1900, Harrison and her family moved to Australia, where she continued to work as an illustrator for various publications, including The Lone Hand and The Sydney Mail. She also designed illustrations for commercial products, such as advertisements, postcards, and calendars. Her illustrations for children's books, including The Magic Pudding by Norman Lindsay, were particularly noteworthy. Harrison's distinctive style was in contrast to the prevailing trends of modernism and abstraction.

Harrison's work was well-received by the public, and she received several awards and honors for her contributions to the art world. In 1913, she won the Wynne Prize, an Australian art award, for her watercolor painting "The Lesson." She also won the New South Wales Society of Women Painters and Sculptors' Medal in 1938.

Florence Susan Harrison passed away in Sydney in 1955 at the age of 77.

Books

"Rhymes and Reasons" 1905
"The Rhyme of a Run" 1907
"Rhyme of a Farm"
"In the Fairy Ring" 1908
"Goblin Market, and other Poems" by Christina Rossetti 1910
"Guinevere and other poems" by Alfred Tennyson 1912
"Elfin Song" 1912
"Early Poems" by William Morris 1914
"Three Silver Pennies by Dorothy King  1914
"Tales in Rhyme and Colour" (re-packaged edition of Rhyme of a Run) 1916
"Tinkler Johnny" by A. Herbertson 1916
"Poems" by Samuel Ferguson 1916
"The Man in the Moon" (re-packaged last 5 stories from In the Fairy Ring) 1917
"The Pixy Book" (re-packaged first 4 stories from In the Fairy Ring) 1917-1918
"The House of Bricks" by Agnes Grozier Herbertson 1918
"Godmother's Garden" by Netta Syrett 1918
"Blackie's Children's Diary"  1921
"Beautiful Poems"  series of shorter versions (8 color plates each) of older works published in 1923 by Black:
"The Fairy Kites" by Ethel K. Crawford 1927
"Mopsa the Fairy" by Jean Ingelow 1932
"The Magic Duck and Other Stories" by Dorothy King 1939

Other works attributed to her but probably done by Emma Florence Harrison or another artist with the same name:
"Light of Love" published by Arthur L. Humphreys 1908
A series of Fairy Postcards printed by Vivian Mansell & Co. Ltd. 1932

External links

Illustrations from Elfin Song
Illustrations from Christina Rossetti's Poems
Chris Beetle's Emma Florence Harrison gallery

References

English illustrators
1955 deaths
1877 births
Pre-Raphaelite illustrators